Advani is a surname found among Sindhis. Advani is most commonly used to refer to Lal Krishna Advani, former Deputy Prime Minister of India, and Kiara Advani, a Bollywood actress also known as Alia Advani.

Other people with this surname include:

 Pratibha Advani, Indian talk show host and daughter of Lal Krishna Advani
 Bherumal Meharchand Advani, Indian writer
 Bhudo Advani, Indian film actor
 Hotchand Gopaldas Advani, Indian Lawyer, Educationalist and Businessman
 Kalyan Bulchand Advani, Sindhi language scholar of India
 Nikkhil Advani, Indian film director
 Pankaj Advani, Indian snooker player
 Suresh H. Advani, Indian oncologist
 Poornima Advani Indian lawyer, author and social worker
 Avinash Advani, Pakistani Independent Researcher & Author

References 

Indian surnames
Sindhi tribes
Sindhi tribes in India